Josiah Ober is an American historian of ancient Greece and classical political theorist. He is Tsakopoulos-Kounalakis Professor in honor of Constantine Mitsotakis, and professor of classics and political science, at Stanford University.  His teaching and research links ancient Greek history and philosophy with modern political theory and practice.

Career

Ober was educated at the University of Minnesota (B.A., major in history, 1975) and the University of Michigan (Ph.D., Department of History, 1980).

He was a professor of ancient history at Montana State University (1980–1990), and then at Princeton University (1990–2006).

He has received fellowships from the American Council of Learned Societies (1989–90), the National Endowment for the Humanities (1997), and the Center for Advanced Study in the Behavioral Science (2004-5). 

He delivered the 2002-2003 Sigmund H. Danziger, Jr. Memorial Lecture in the Humanities at the University of Chicago and the 2019 Sather Lectures University of California, Berkeley.

Ober was a student of Chester Starr, and has taught classicist John Ma, ancient Greek historian Emily Mackil, and the political theorist Ryan Balot.

Influence
Ober's Mass and Elite in Democratic Athens won the Goodwin Award in 1989. Some early work was criticized by Mogens Herman Hansen for overemphasizing the ideological aspect of Athenian democracy against its institutional dimension, and P.J. Rhodes accused him of abandoning scholarly impartiality in favour of democratic advocacy. In a review of The Rise and Fall of Classical Greece for New Left Review, Peter Rose concluded that Ober had produced “an eccentric, at times intriguing, but deeply flawed work of history, which ultimately tells us more about the ideology of the Stanford classics department than it does about ancient Greece”.

Paul Cartledge called Mass and Elite in Democratic Athens “a seminal work”.  Jennifer Roberts called Political Dissent in Democratic Athens “a major contribution to a dialogue of enormous import”. Melissa Lane wrote: "Ober draws on empirical evidence about the ancient world in the service of normative political theory, and in so doing sheds light not just on Athens but on the creation and operation of democratic institutions."

Danielle Allen praised Ober's "Democracy and Knowledge' in The New Republic (2008).

Adriaan Lanni's review praised Rise and Fall as part of the “exciting (and controversial) recent developments” in the 'Stanford school of ancient history' and judged Ober's arguments an “unusually compelling compilation of methods, data and argument in support of a broad thesis.” Barton Swaim called Demopolis: Democracy Before Liberalism a “tightly reasoned work of scholarship” in his Wall Street Journal review.

Books

Authored
 Fortress Attica: Defense of the Athenian Land Frontier, 404-322 B.C., Leiden: E.J. Brill, 1985.
 Mass and Elite in Democratic Athens: Rhetoric, Ideology, and the Power of the People, Princeton: Princeton University Press, 1989.
 The Athenian Revolution: Essays on Ancient Greek Democracy and Political Theory, Princeton: Princeton University Press, 1996.
 Political Dissent in Democratic Athens: Intellectual Critics of Popular Rule, Princeton: Princeton University Press, 1998.
 Athenian Legacies: Essays on the Politics of Going on Together, Princeton: Princeton University Press, 2005.
 Democracy and Knowledge: Innovation and Learning in Classical Athens, Princeton: Princeton University Press, 2008.
 The Rise and Fall of Classical Greece, Princeton: Princeton University Press, 2016.
 Demopolis: Democracy Before Liberalism, Cambridge: Cambridge University Press, 2018.

Co-authored
 with Manville, B., A Company of Citizens: What the World's First Democracy Teaches Leaders about Creating Great Organizations, Cambridge, MA: Harvard Business Press, 2003.
 with Kurt A. Raaflaub, Robert Wallace, Origins of Democracy in Ancient Greece, Berkeley, University of California Press, 2007.

Edited
 with Eadie, J., The Craft of the Ancient Historian: Essays in Honor of Chester G. Starr, University Press of America: Lanham, 1985.
 with Euben, P., and Wallach, J., Athenian Political Thought and the Reconstruction of American Democracy, Cornell University Press: Ithaca, 1994.
 with Hedrick, C., Dēmokratia: A Conversation on Democracies, Ancient and Modern, Princeton University Press: Princeton, 1996.

References

External links
 
 "Democratic Lessons: What the Greeks Can Teach Us, (Part I) - A Conversation with Josh Ober", Ideas Roadshow, 2015
  "Learning from Athens", 2006
  "Classicists Crunch Data to Test Hypotheses about Greece", 2015

Year of birth missing (living people)
Living people
University of Minnesota College of Liberal Arts alumni
University of Michigan alumni
American educators
American political philosophers
Historians of antiquity
20th-century American historians
20th-century American male writers
21st-century American historians
21st-century American male writers
American male non-fiction writers